I Shout Love is a 2001 Canadian short film written and directed by Sarah Polley. The film stars Matthew Ferguson and Kristen Thomson as Bobby and Tessa, a couple who are on the verge of breaking up when Tessa convinces Bobby to spend one last night together recording video of them reenacting the better times in their relationship.

The film won the Genie Award for Best Live Action Short Drama at the 23rd Genie Awards in 2003, and Thomson won an ACTRA Award for her performance.

The film was screened on CBC Television's Canadian Reflections in 2002, and was later distributed on the DVD release of Polley's feature film Away from Her.

References

External links 
 

2001 films
English-language Canadian films
Films directed by Sarah Polley
Films with screenplays by Sarah Polley
Best Live Action Short Drama Genie and Canadian Screen Award winners
2001 directorial debut films
2000s English-language films
Canadian drama short films
2000s Canadian films